The Ajaokuta–Kaduna–Kano Natural Gas Pipeline (AKKP) is a  pipeline planned to transport natural gas from Ajaokuta, in Kogi State to Kano, in Kano State, through several states and urban centers, as part of  the Trans Nigeria Gas Pipeline. Construction of the AKKP commenced in July 2020.

Location

Background
This pipeline is intended to establish a connection between pipeline networks in the eastern, western and northern regions of Nigeria. The project strives to utilize the country’s abundant natural gas resources to sustainably supply gas to northern Nigeria. The development is expected to reduce the quantity of gas flared in the country's oil fields and thus improve air quality. The Nigerian National Petroleum Corporation (NNPC), announced tenders for this project in July 2013. The Cabinet of Nigeria approved the project in December 2017.

Construction
The project has been divided into three phases, under a build and transfer (BT) model, in a public-private partnership (PPP) arrangement, which involves the contractor providing 100 percent of the financing. With 15 percent financing of about US$430 million already secured from international lenders, it is anticipated that closure on the remaining US$2.5 billion (85 percent) will be achieved with Chinese lenders during the second quarter of 2020.

First phase
This covers the section between Ajaokuta and Abuja, that measures . This phase is budgeted to cost US$855 million. In April 2018, the engineering, procurement and construction (EPC) contract for this phase was awarded to a consortium comprising  OilServ and Oando.

Second phase

Third phase
The EPC contract for the third phase was awarded to the Brentex/China Petroleum Pipeline Bureau consortium.

Funding
In March 2020, the total project cost was budgeted at US$2,890,522,548.37. China Export and Credit Insurance Corporation (Sinosure) agreed to provide insurance cover for 85 percent of the total, which will be borrowed from Chinese financial institutions, to the sum of US$2,591,849,049.19. The Nigerian Gas Company (NGC) a subsidiary of the Nigerian National Petroleum Corporation (NNPC), will provide equity financing worth US$434 million (15 percent). Construction is expected to last 24 months.

See also

 Abuja Thermal Power Station
 Azura Thermal Power Station
 Trans-Saharan gas pipeline

References

External links
  Construction of Ajaokuta-Kaduna-Kano gas pipeline in Nigeria to begin As of 7 January 2020.

Proposed energy infrastructure in Africa
Natural gas pipelines in Nigeria
Proposed pipelines in Africa
Natural gas in Nigeria
Proposed energy infrastructure in Nigeria